The Ministry of Works or  was one of the Six Ministries under the Department of State Affairs in imperial China.

History
The ministry was established during the Sui dynasty as one of the six functional divisions of the Department of State Affairs. It was also part of the same department during the Five Dynasties period and the Song dynasty. After the merger of the "three departments" (Zhongshu Sheng, Menxia Sheng and Shangshu Sheng), it was reassigned to the Zhongshu Sheng (Secretariat) in the Yuan Empire and later the Ming Empire. In 1380, the office of Secretariat was abolished and the ministries, including the Ministry of Works, became independent and continued to report directly to the emperor.

Under the Ming and Qing, it lost some influence in favor of agencies run by palace eunuchs, provincial coordinators, and governors. It was usually considered the weakest of the six ministries. During some periods (under the Southern Song and Yuan) it was merged with the Ministry of Justice.

The ministry was headed by the Minister of Shangshu (pinyin: shàng shū, Chinese: 尚書; Manchu: aliha amban), who had the Standard class, Rank 3 under the Changs (in the Nine-rank system); Secondary class, Rank 2 under the Song; Standard class, Rank 1 under the Jin, Yuan and Ming up to 1380; Standard class, Rank 2 under the Ming after 1380 and Qing; and Secondary class, Rank 1 under the Qing after 1730. During the Qing dynasty, there was one minister for the Manchu and another for the Chinese. He was assisted by two deputy ministers, called Shilang (pinyin: shì lang, Chinese: 侍郎; Manchu: ashan-i amban).

Functions
Under the Ming, the Ministry of Works had charge of weights and measures, the construction and maintenance of transportation infrastructure (especially roads and canals), other government construction works (especially flood control projects), the manufacturing and provision of government equipment, the public exploitation of natural resources, and the hiring of artisans or laborers for temporary service. Permanent hires fell under the purview of the Ministry of Personnel.

See also
 Traditional Chinese measures

References

Citations

Sources 

 
 

Government of Imperial China
Six Ministries
Government of the Ming dynasty
Government of the Tang dynasty
Government of the Song dynasty
Government of the Yuan dynasty
Government of the Qing dynasty
Government of the Sui dynasty